The 2023 ICC Cricket World Cup Qualifier Play-off is scheduled to be the inaugural edition of the ICC Cricket World Cup Qualifier Play-off, a cricket tournament which forms part of the 2023 Cricket World Cup Qualification process. It is scheduled to take place in March and April 2023, with all matches having One Day International (ODI) status, regardless of whether or not a team had ODI status prior to the start of the event.

Six teams were qualified for the tournament, the bottom four teams from the 2019–2023 ICC Cricket World Cup League 2 along with the top teams in Groups A and B of the 2019–2022 ICC Cricket World Cup Challenge League. The top two teams from this tournament will progress to the 2023 Cricket World Cup Qualifier, while the rest will be eliminated from the World Cup.

This competition will also determine any promotion or relegation between League 2 and Challenge League. The two teams who finished in the bottom places of League 2 (Papua New Guinea and the United Arab Emirates) and the two Challenge League winners (Canada and Jersey), will play in a de facto sub-tournament: the top two teams within this quartet will qualify for the next edition of League 2, while the bottom two teams will play in the next edition of the Challenge League..U.A.E and PNG also have the oppurtunity to retain their ODI status if they manage to finish above Canada and Jersey in the points table.

The International Cricket Council announced the schedule for the tournament on 20 March 2023.

Teams and qualification

Squads

On 16 March 2023, United States wicket-keeper Saideep Ganesh was ruled out of tournament due to an injury sustained during the training camp in Bengaluru, with Saiteja Mukkamalla named as his replacement.

Points table

Fixtures

References

2023 in cricket
Qualifier play off
ICC
ICC